Hitman is a 2014 Dhallywood film directed by Wazed Ali Sumon. starring Shakib Khan and Apu Biswas in lead roles, while Misha Sawdagar, Joy Chowdhury, Shirin Shila play other pivotal roles. The film was released on 6 October 2014 of Eid-ul-Adha in 119 screens.
The film is a remake of 2012 Tamil blockbuster film Vettai.

Plot
Hitman is a powerful story of two siblings, Rana and Shuvo, who are very different from each other. Their father was a police constable but after his death, Shuvo assumes the same duty. Due to his lack of bravery, Shuvo finds it difficult to fight crime. It is in these times that Rana, who is not a cop, steps up and assists his elder brother. As Shuvo wins many of his brother's battles with crime, the accolades are showered onto Shuvo to an extent that he is promoted as the Superintendent of Police. The turning point in the story arises when Shuvo is caught off guard and brutally thrashed. It now becomes imperative for Rana to build his brothers courage to face his fears and overcome them. This point onwards we see Shuvo stand tall and brave and how, he along with Rana, tackles the villains who are out to hunt them down.

Cast
 Shakib Khan as Rana
 Apu Biswas as Tania
 Misha Sawdagor as Dabla
 Joy Chowdhury as Shuvo
 Shirin Shila as Tarin
 Sujata
 Shiba Shanu
 DJ Shohel

References

2014 films
2014 action films
Bengali-language Bangladeshi films
Bangladeshi action films
Films scored by Ali Akram Shuvo
Bangladeshi remakes of Indian films
2010s Bengali-language films
Films directed by Wajed Ali Sumon